The Mitsuoka Ryoga is an Entry-level luxury sedan manufactured by Mitsuoka. There are two versions of it, a wagon and a sedan. It has a fuel tank capacity of 60L. The price of the Ryoga ranges from 2,461,000 yen to 2,871,750 yen.

First generation

When the Ryoga was first released in 1998, it was based on the Nissan Primera and had a 1.8L or 2.0L engine. The 1.8L engine produced 125 hp. The 2.0L engine produced 150 hp.

Second generation

When the car entered its second generation, the car became based on the Nissan Sunny and Sentra. This changed the engine size to 1.5L. This 1.5L engine produces . It is classified as a low emission vehicle.

Trim levels
There are two trim levels. Royal, which has slightly better equipment and Deluxe. During the 2000 model year there was a larger limited edition with a 1998cc engine. There were two more limited editions in 2004. During that year Mitsuoka released a Soft Leather Edition and a Final Model edition.

See also
Nissan Primera
Nissan Sunny

References 

Sedans
Mitsuoka vehicles
Cars of Japan
Retro-style automobiles
Cars introduced in 1998
2000s cars